Policy Review was a conservative journal published between 1977 and 2013.

It was founded by The Heritage Foundation and was for many years the foundation's flagship publication. In 2001, the publication was acquired by the Stanford University-based Hoover Institution. Its office was on Washington, D.C.'s Dupont Circle. Following the February–March 2013 issue, Policy Review ceased publication.

Editors
 Tucker Carlson
 Dinesh D'Souza
 Michael Johns
 Tod Lindberg

Contributing authors

 Spencer Abraham
 Elliott Abrams
 George Allen
 Dick Armey
 Peter Berkowitz
 John R. Bolton
 William F. Buckley, Jr.
 Tom Clancy
 Robert Cooper
 Bob Dole
 Daniel Drezner
 Mary Eberstadt
 David R. Henderson
 Toomas Hendrik Ilves
 Robert Kagan
 Ivan Krastev
 Daniel Pipes
 Jonas Savimbi
 Kori Schake
 Peter Thiel
 Justin Vaïsse
 Kurt Volker

References

External links
 Policy Review Official Web Site.

Bimonthly magazines published in the United States
News magazines published in the United States
Conservative magazines published in the United States
Defunct political magazines published in the United States
The Heritage Foundation
Hoover Institution
Magazines established in 1977
Magazines disestablished in 2013
Magazines published in Washington, D.C.
New Right (United States)
Stanford University publications